Scott Strauss may refer to:

Scott Strauss, character in Suburgatory
Scott Strauss, character played by Stephen Dorff in World Trade Center

See also
Scott Straus, American professor of political science